The Saffron Walden Railway was a branch of the Great Eastern Railway between Audley End and Bartlow on the Stour Valley Railway between Shelford to Haverhill, a distance of .

Branch information

Opening
The line was opened between Audley End and Saffron Walden on 21 November 1865 and to Bartlow in 1866.

Operation and services
The line was the initiative of the local Gibson family whose bank helped to finance the railway. It remained independent until 1 January 1877 when the Great Eastern Railway purchased the line. The Engineer's Line Reference for the line is AEB.

Initially, there were six return trains a day and, between 1877 and 1894, trains operated between Saffron Walden and London. Coaches dating from the 1890s operated on the line until the 1950s. From July 1958, the line was operated by railbuses until closure.

Closure
The line closed to passengers on 7 September 1964 and to freight three months later. At Audley End, services used a separate platform, the building of which still remains, in the current car park.

References

External links 
 Slideshow of station photographs including some on Saffron Walden Railway
 
 Photographs of the stations

Rail transport in Essex
Rail transport in Cambridgeshire
Railway lines opened in 1865
Railway companies disestablished in 1877
Closed railway lines in the East of England
Saffron Walden
British companies disestablished in 1877